City Out of Wilderness is a 1974 American short documentary film produced by Francis Thompson. It was nominated for an Academy Award for Best Documentary Short Subject. Produced by the United States Capitol Historical Society, City Out of Wilderness chronicles the history and evolution of Washington, D.C., from its very beginnings to the then-modern era of the 1970s.

See also
 List of American films of 1974

References

External links

1974 films
1970s short documentary films
American short documentary films
Documentary films about cities in the United States
Documentary films about United States history
Films shot in Washington, D.C.
History of Washington, D.C.
Sponsored films
United States Capitol
1970s English-language films
1970s American films